ASTP may refer to:
 A Swiftly Tilting Planet (novel)
 Apollo–Soyuz Test Project, docking in orbit, 1975
 Advanced Space Transportation Program, NASA's core technology program for all space transportation,
 Army Specialized Training Program, a US military training program during World War II
 Association of European Science and Technology Transfer Professionals
 Arak Science and Technology Park